Loch Bredan was a British sailing ship built in Glasgow in 1882 which disappeared without trace with all hands around November 1903.

History
The Loch Bredan was a steel-hulled barque of the "Loch" ships of the Sproat Line of Liverpool designed as an ocean-going cargo ship. She first arrived in Australia at Watson's Bay on 25 November 1891, having left Antwerp on 11 August under command of Captain R. Cumming.

In 1902 she was forced to return to port a fortnight after leaving Sydney on her return journey, having run into such severe weather that three lifeboats were smashed and the ship's galley stoved in.

There were grave fears for the vessel's safety on her 1903 voyage from Liverpool to Hobart under Captain T Williams, as she appeared to be around two weeks overdue. Those fears were groundless, as she had been simply held up by unfavourable weather.

Last voyage
She left Adelaide, South Australia in September 1903, having picked up a few crew and a cargo of compressed fodder.

In early 1904 speculation and concern about the missing ship appeared in the press.
She was never heard from again and no scrap of wreckage was ever found. The crew consisted of :— Thomas Williams (master), J. M. Scott (first mate), G. Howell (second mate), J. A. Gibbons (carpenter), C. L. Williams (sailmaker), W. Williams (cook and steward), A. Gaerkens, H. Skinner, D. Friel, T. Williams, T. T. Gunn, J. L. James, G. Hartfield, L. J. Monoghan, C. Burns, S.Thomas (boy). The captain's wife (Mrs. Williams) was also on the articles as stewardess. Five men: N. M. McKcnzie, F. Bucknall. R. Leppar, C. Nelson, joined the vessel at Port Adelaide. F. Bucknall was the son of Frederick Estcourt Bucknall, a former parliamentarian, brewer and real estate developer who lost his fortune in a recent recession.

See also
List of people who disappeared mysteriously at sea

References

External links 
 James Sproat's Loch Line

1882 establishments in Scotland
1882 ships
1900s missing person cases
Maritime incidents in 1903
Missing ships of Australia
People lost at sea
Ships built in Govan
Ships lost with all hands
Shipwrecks in the Indian Ocean